Keramet is a village in Bursa Province, Turkey.

At  it is a part of Orhangazi ilçe (district). Its distance to Orhangazi is 
 The settled population of the village is 1000 

The village is known for its hot springs and health tourism plays a major role in village economy.

References

Hot springs of Turkey
Villages in Orhangazi District